Ochlenberg is a municipality in the Oberaargau administrative district in the canton of Bern in Switzerland.

History
Ochlenberg is first mentioned in 1612 as Ochliberg.

Geography
Of this area,  or 62.7% is used for agricultural purposes, while  or 32.4% is forested. Of the rest of the land,  or 4.3% is settled (buildings or roads),  or 0.2% is either rivers or lakes.

Of the built up area, housing and buildings made up 2.5% and transportation infrastructure made up 1.7%.  Out of the forested land, 31.3% of the total land area is heavily forested and 1.1% is covered with orchards or small clusters of trees.  Of the agricultural land, 31.2% is used for growing crops and 29.2% is pastures, while 2.4% is used for orchards or vine crops.  All the water in the municipality is in rivers and streams.

Demographics
, 1.0% of the population was made up of foreign nationals. Over the last 10 years the population has decreased at a rate of -11.9%. Most of the population speaks German  (99.4%), with French being second most common ( 0.5%) and Russian being third ( 0.2%).

The age distribution of the population is children and teenagers (0–19 years old) make up 25.6% of the population, while adults (20–64 years old) make up 54.3% and seniors (over 64 years old) make up 20.1%.  In Ochlenberg about 79.9% of the population (between age 25-64) have completed either non-mandatory upper secondary education or additional higher education (either university or a Fachhochschule).

Ochlenberg has an unemployment rate of 0.55%.  , there were 212 people employed in the primary economic sector and about 67 businesses involved in this sector.  4 people are employed in the secondary sector and there are 3 businesses in this sector.  9 people are employed in the tertiary sector, with 4 businesses in this sector.
The historical population is given in the following table:

References

External links

Municipalities of the canton of Bern